The 2018–19 Sint Maarten Senior League is the 42nd season of the Sint Maarten Senior League, the top-tier football league in Sint Maarten. The season began on 28 October 2018.

Regular season

Playoffs

References

Sint Maarten Senior League
Sint Maarten
1